This is a list of Brazilian television related events from 1993.

Events

Debuts

Television shows

1970s
Turma da Mônica (1976–present)

Ending this year

Births
26 January - Felipe Simas, actor
15 March - Brenno Leone, actor
24 March - Miguel Roncato, actor
28 March - Juliana Paiva, actress & model

See also
1993 in Brazil

Deaths